Pylones is a French gift shop chain.

Overview 
Pylones was founded in Paris in 1985, by Jacques Guillemet and Lena Guillemet.

They have 110 shops in 20 countries in Europe, the Middle East, South America, Asia and South Africa.

The New York Times called it "On the Corner of Cute, Between Stupid and Clever".

References

External links

Retail companies established in 1985
Retail companies of France
1985 establishments in France
French brands